Association Sportive Aorai, is a football club from Papeete, Tahiti. It's named after the Mont Aorai, the third tallest mountain on the main island of Tahiti. They last competed at Tahiti Ligue 1 in 2017–18.

Last seasons

References

Football clubs in Tahiti
Football clubs in French Polynesia